The Altmark gas field is a natural gas field located in Saxony-Anhalt. It was discovered in 1968 and developed by EEG (Erdöl Erdgas Gommern), today GDF Suez. It began production in 1969 and produces natural gas and condensates.

References

Natural gas fields in Germany